"Swalwell Hopping" is a Geordie folk song written in the 19th century by John Selkirk, in a style deriving from music hall.

This piece tells of the many a funny prank being played by the Crowley's Crew, (workers who appear in other writings of the time), and mentioning (fictitious) characters like Knack-kneed Mat, Slavering Nell, Gyetside Jack, and Willayton Dan. It turns into (almost) a celebration of Crowley's Crew.

Lyrics 
The song was later printed in 1840 and later in 1899 in the 198-page book "Songs and Ballads of Northern England" collected and edited by John Stokoe. It was published by W. Scott of Newcastle upon Tyne. The lyrics for "Swalwell Hopping Air – Paddy's Wedding":

History of the Hopping

The word "Hopping" meant "a fair" in Anglo-Saxon and "a dance" in middle English, and it is from this that it developed. Mainly in the North East of England, it changed from a small local village meeting with dancing, into a large annual funfair. These have changed over the years from ornate, carved and highly decorated small roundabouts to the larger attractions.

The Swalwell Hopping has its traditional way back in history. It was held annually at Whitsuntide and developed into a carnival of sports and horse racing before turning into the funfair. It was held for a time near the town gate at the waterside, and later moved to a more permanent home on the ground at the rear of Ridley Gardens (known locally as the Hopping Field.

One of, if not the, largest employers in the 19th century were the ironworks of Crowley and Co. at Swalwell and Winlaton. The workers were proud craftsmen. They allegedly could make anything "ftev a needle tiv an anchor". They were also political radicals, who worked hard in unpleasant conditions, and played hard. The workers, often referred to as "Crowley's Crew", together with the local keelmen, were always to be seen at the hoppings in the 18th and 19th centuries. According to the song, they all enjoyed themselves, and possibly became rather too boisterous.

In the 1950s, it was reported that at the annual Swalwell Hopping were "fairground rides such as the waltzer and carousel merry-go-round with traditional animal mounts, barley twist poles and fairy lights, a coconut shy, hoop-la stalls, a rifle range and other stalls where you could win various prizes, including a goldfish if you could throw a table tennis ball into one of many goldfish bowls. Many tickets were issued to schoolchildren giving half price rides for threepence and popular records of the day were amplified and played all evening"  The various changes in life style sounded the death knell of the Swalwell in the 1960s.  The "Hopping Field" is now a housing estate.

Places mentioned 
Swalwell was a village. It is now part of Newcastle upon Tyne                                       
Winlaton was a village in County Durham but is now part of Gateshead
Whickham was a village in County Durham but is now part of Gateshead
Newcassel is Newcastle upon Tyne
Gyetside is Gateshead

Trades mentioned 
Keelman were the dockers of yesteryear, who worked on the keels (or keelboats) of the River Tyne. Many, in fact the majority, resided as a close-knit community with their families in the Sandgate area, to the east of the city and beside the river. Their work included working on the keels/keelboats which were used to transfer coal from the river banks to the waiting colliers, for transport to various destinations including London.

Comments on variations to the above version 
There are various published versions of the song, and some seem to have difficulties in following the original Geordie dialect. Here are some of the variations :
"wor" is written in some versions as "wour"
"Hopping" is spelt variously as "Hoppen'" or "Hoppin'", with or without the final apostrophe
" aw" is often written as "a'"
"frae" may be written "fra"
"se" is often written as "sae"
"awd" may be written "aud"
Verse 8 line 1 apparently refers to Joan Carr (or should that be John Carr)?
Verse 9 line 6 "sic" is often written "sec"
Verse 9 line 7 "wheit" has the meaning "quite"
Other definitions and meanings can be found in Geordie dialect words

See also
Geordie dialect words

References

External links 
Swalwell Hoppings from Swalwell Online

English folk songs
Songs related to Newcastle upon Tyne
1800s songs
Northumbrian folklore